Keezhamanai is a revenue village in Karaikal taluk, Karaikal district, Puducherry Union territory.

References

Villages in Karaikal district